Kelsey Creek is a watercourse in Lake County, California, United States, that feeds  Clear Lake from the south.
The watershed was forest-covered. In the lower parts it has been converted to farmland and for urban use. Higher up the forests have been cleared, regrown and cleared again.
The northern part of the creek flows through a geothermal field that feeds power plants and hot springs.
The wooded Cobb area in the higher part of the watershed holds resorts and resort communities, some dating to the 1850s.

Name

The creek takes its name from Andrew Kelsey, the first European-American settler in Lake County.
Andrew Kelsey was killed in 1850 in an uprising against him by a band of Pomo whom Kelsey had enslaved. 
This episode ended with the Bloody Island massacre on an island in Clear Lake.

Course

It flows in a northwest direction through the mountains to Big Valley, then flows north to the lake, which it enters through Clear Lake State Park.
At its mouth it is called Kelsey Slough.
The creek is the third largest watercourse flowing into Clear Lake.

The creek bed is fairly steep in the upper reaches and through the canyons, flattening out in the plains that open to Big Valley.
Upstream Kelsey Creek and tributaries such as Lee Creek, Jones Creek and Alder Creek flow year round.
Downstream, the section of Kelsey Creek from Main Street Bridge in Kelseyville to the lake is usually dry in mid-summer.
Fish cannot pass these falls.

Watershed

The region holds greywacke sandstone, chert and serpentinite rocks of the Franciscan Assemblage that have been highly sheared and faulted with ridges and valleys trending northwest-southeast.
The area is seismically very active, but the earthquakes are low intensity.
Landslides are very common throughout the upper part of the watershed, The Geysers area.
In this area the soils are shallow loams and gravelly loams over bedrock, and are relatively infertile with low levels of nitrogen.
They are vulnerable to erosion if disturbed by construction.

It is a narrow corridor  that runs northwest through the Northern California Coast Ranges into Big Valley, a flat region south of the western part of Clear Lake.
It is about 10% of the Clear Lake watershed, and contributes about 16% of the water flowing into the lake.

The watershed has a Mediterranean climate with warm summers and mild winters.
At one time valley oak woodlands may have covered most of Big Valley, and some remnants of these woodlands remain near the shores of the lake and along watercourses.
Better roads in the early 20th century led to an increase in production of walnuts, pears and grapes, mainly in the flat part of Big Valley.
Most of Big Valley is now used for agriculture or is urbanized.
Kelseyville is the largest community in the watershed, on the east side of Big Valley.

South of Big Valley in the higher country the main vegetation is blue oak woodlands, gray pines and annual grasslands.
Above about  the main land cover is chaparral, with patches of California live oak woodlands on the higher ridges.
The upper end of the watershed has soils of volcanic materials, with conifer or hardwood-conifer forests.
The Cobb area's resort and residential communities lie within these forests.

Tributaries

Geothermal field

The Geysers geothermal field includes the upper Kelsey Creek Watershed, as well as parts of Lake and Sonoma counties to the south.
From the 1850s hot spring resorts to the east of the upper Kelsey Creek began to attract visitors.
The first viable geothermal power plant was developed in 1956.
As of 2010 there were about sixty active geothermal wells in the watershed.
A 1981 report noted that geothermal plants in the Kelsey Creek area were causing air quality problems through hydrogen sulfide emissions.
Construction of roads and drill pads opens large areas of soil to erosion by heavy rains, washing into the creek's tributaries and degrading water quality.
The power plants also interfere with activities such as hunting, fishing and general recreation.

Lumber

In 1856 John Cobb opened the first sawmill along Kelsey Creek in Cobb Valley.
Lumber was need for underground supports in the borax mine at Borax Lake, north of Clearlake, and in the Sulphur Bank Mine.
Wood was also needed for the mines' reducing furnaces.
Most of this came from the volcanic uplands of Kelsey Creek and neighboring watersheds.
By the end of the 19th century most of the prime timber in the Boggs Mountain area had been cleared, and the land was mainly being used for pasturage rather than timber.
After World War II (1939–1945) there was a boom in construction, and all the usable old-growth and secondary forest was clear cut.
The state bought the land for the Boggs Mountain Demonstration State Forest for just $38,700 because it held no timber of commercial value.

Tourism

In the 1850s people from the San Francisco Bay Area and the Central Valley began to vacation in resorts in the Kelsey creek area.
The Glenbrook Resort was a stage stop between the Bay Area and Clear Lake, with resorts both north and south of Glenbrook.
Road improvements in the 1910s and 1920s resulted in new resorts being opened along the roads.
In the early 1920s Jim McCauley established a resort on the creek between Cobb and Whispering Pines, west of his Boggs Mountain property.
It was originally named Camp Calso but renamed to Forest Lake Resort in 1938.
McCauley dammed a tributary of Kelsey Creek to create Lake McCauley in 1935.

See also
Rivers of Lake County, California

Notes

Sources

 

Rivers of Lake County, California
Mayacamas Mountains